The 2022 United States Senate election in Nevada was held on November 8, 2022, to elect a member of the United States Senate to represent the State of Nevada. Incumbent Democratic senator Catherine Cortez Masto won re-election to a second term, narrowly defeating Republican challenger Adam Laxalt. Nevada's election results were slowed due to state law that allowed voters to submit mail-in ballots until November 12, and allowed voters to fix clerical problems in their mail-in ballots until November 14, 2022.

According to exit polls, Cortez Masto won 62% of Latinos, 64% of young voters, and 52% of women.

Cortez Masto made protecting abortion rights a central issue of her campaign. Many experts and forecasters saw Nevada as Republicans' best chance to pickup a seat in the Senate.

Cortez Masto flipped Washoe County, improving her 2016 voteshare by 1.7%, although Laxalt improved on Joe Heck's margin in rural counties, and performed slightly better in Clark County. With a margin of 0.77%, this was the closest Senate race of the 2022 election cycle and the closest Senate election in Nevada since 1998.

Democratic primary

Candidates

Nominee 
Catherine Cortez Masto, incumbent U.S. Senator (2017–present) and former Attorney General of Nevada (2007–2015)

Eliminated in primary 
Stephanie Kasheta
Corey Reid
Allen Rheinhart, Black Lives Matter activist and candidate for governor in 2014, U.S. Senate in 2016 and Nevada's 1st congressional district in 2020

Endorsements

Results

Republican primary

Candidates

Nominee 
 Adam Laxalt, former Attorney General of Nevada (2015–2019), nominee for Governor in 2018, and son of former U.S. Senator Pete Domenici and grandson of former U.S. Senator Paul Laxalt

Eliminated in primary 
 Sam Brown, U.S. Army veteran, Purple Heart recipient, candidate for District 102 of the Texas House of Representatives in 2014 and great-grandson of Paul Brown
 William "Bill" Conrad, Retired Combat Veteran 
 Bill Hockstedler, healthcare executive and U.S. Air Force veteran
 Sharelle Mendenhall, pageant queen
 Tyler Perkins
 Carlo Poliak, retired sanitation worker and perennial candidate
 Paul Rodriguez

Declined 
 Heidi Gansert, state senator for the 15th district (2016–present)
 Ben Kieckhefer, state senator for the 16th district (2010–2021)
 Brian Sandoval, president of the University of Nevada, Reno (2020–present) and former Governor of Nevada (2011–2019)

Debates

Endorsements

Polling
Graphical summary

Results

Libertarian primary

Candidates

Declared 
 Neil Scott, accountant

Independent American primary

Candidates

Declared 

Independents

Candidates

Declared 
Barry Lindemann, asset manager

Not on ballot
 J. J. Destin, truck driver
 Gretchen Rae Lowe

General election

Predictions

Endorsements

Polling
Aggregate polls

Graphical summary

Catherine Cortez Masto vs. Sam Brown

Results
Cortez Masto won urban Clark County and Washoe County, home to Las Vegas and Reno respectively. Combined, these two counties contain more than 80% of the state's total population. While her margin in Clark County fell from 11% in 2016 to 8% in this election, she flipped Washoe County, which she lost by less than 1% in 2016, with a 4% margin of victory. Laxalt won by landslide margins in Nevada's rural counties, but they are lightly populated and cast less than 16% of the total vote. In the end, Cortez Masto's victories in the state's two largest counties gave her too large a lead for Laxalt to overcome in rural Nevada. As of 2023, no Republican has won any U.S. Senate race in Nevada since 2012.

Counties that flipped from Republican to Democratic
 Washoe (largest municipality: Reno)

See also 
 2022 United States Senate elections
 2022 Nevada elections

Notes

Partisan clients

References

External links 
Official campaign websites
 J. J. Destin (I) for Senate
 Catherine Cortez Masto (D) for Senate
 Adam Laxalt (R) for Senate

2022
Nevada
United States Senate